Jay Wright Forrester (July 14, 1918 – November 16, 2016) was a pioneering American computer engineer and systems scientist. He is credited with being one of the inventors of magnetic core memory, the predominant form of random-access computer memory during the most explosive years of digital computer development (between 1955 and 1975). It was part of a family of related technologies which bridged the gap between vacuum tubes and semiconductors by exploiting the magnetic properties of materials to perform switching and amplification.

He is also believed to have created the first animation in the history of computer graphics, a "jumping ball" on an oscilloscope.

Later, he was a professor at the MIT Sloan School of Management, where he introduced the Forrester effect describing fluctuations in supply chains, and is credited as the founder of system dynamics, which deals with the simulation of interactions between objects in dynamic systems and is most often applied to research and consulting in organizations and other social systems.

Early days
Forrester was born on a farm near Anselmo, Nebraska, where "his early interest in electricity was spurred, perhaps, by the fact that the ranch had none. While in high school, he built a wind-driven, 12-volt electrical system using old car parts—it gave the ranch its first electric power."

Forrester received his Bachelor of Science in Electrical Engineering in 1939 from the University of Nebraska–Lincoln, was inducted in 1949 into Eta Kappa Nu (ΗΚΝ) the Electrical & Computer Engineering Honor Society, and went on to graduate school at the Massachusetts Institute of Technology, where he would spend his entire career.

Career

Whirlwind project/Magnetic core memory/Computer graphics

During the 1940s and early 50s, Forrester did research in electrical and computer engineering at MIT, heading the Whirlwind project, perfecting magnetic-core memory, and developing the "multi-coordinate digital information storage device" (coincident-current system), the forerunner of today's RAM. He is also believed to have created the first animation in the history of computer graphics, a "jumping ball" on an oscilloscope.

Forrester effect
In 1956, Forrester moved to the MIT Sloan School of Management, where he was Germeshausen Professor Emeritus and Senior Lecturer. In 1961, arising from a project with General Electric, he wrote about the expanding effects down the supply chains due to fluctuations in demand, originally known as the Forrester effect and today more frequently described as the "bullwhip effect". 
In 1972, he received the IEEE Medal of Honor, IEEEs highest award. 
In 1982, he received the IEEE Computer Pioneer Award. In 1995, he was made a Fellow of the Computer History Museum "for his perfecting of core memory technology into a practical computer memory device; for fundamental contributions to early computer systems design and development". In 2006, he was inducted into the Operational Research Hall of Fame.

System dynamics
Forrester was the founder of system dynamics, which deals with the simulation of interactions between objects in dynamic systems. Industrial Dynamics was the first book Forrester wrote using system dynamics to analyze industrial business cycles. Several years later, interactions with former Boston Mayor John F. Collins led Forrester to write Urban Dynamics, which sparked an ongoing debate on the feasibility of modeling broader social problems. The book went on to influence the video game SimCity.

The urban dynamics model attracted the attention of urban planners around the world, eventually leading Forrester to meet a founder of the Club of Rome. He later met with the Club of Rome to discuss issues surrounding global sustainability; the book World Dynamics followed. World Dynamics took on modeling the complex interactions of the world economy, population and ecology, which was controversial (see also Donella Meadows and Limits to Growth). It was the start of the field of global modeling. Forrester continued working in applications of system dynamics and promoting its use in education.

Publications
Forrester has written several books, articles and papers. Books, a selection:
 1961. Industrial dynamics. Waltham, MA: Pegasus Communications.
 1968. Principles of Systems, 2nd ed. Pegasus Communications.
 1969. Urban Dynamics. Pegasus Communications.
 1971. World Dynamics. Wright-Allen Press.
 1975. Collected Papers of Jay W. Forrester. Pegasus Communications.
Articles and papers, a selection:
 1958. "Industrial Dynamics--A Major Breakthrough for Decision Makers.", in: Harvard Business Review, Vol. 36, No. 4, pp. 37–66.
 1968, Market Growth as Influenced by Capital Investment in Industrial Management Review, Vol. IX, No. 2, Winter 1968.
 1971, Counterintuitive Behavior of Social Systems. Also available online.
 1989, System Dynamics and the Lessons of 35 Years.
 1991, The Beginning of System Dynamics.
 1992, System Dynamics and Learner-Centered-Learning in Kindergarten through 12th Grade Education.
 1994, Learning through System Dynamics as preparation for the 21st Century.
 1996, System Dynamics and K–12 Teachers.
 1998, Designing the Future.
 1999, System Dynamics: the Foundation Under Systems Thinking.

Counterintuitive Behavior of Social Systems
Counterintuitive Behavior of Social Systems is a 1971 paper by Jay Wright Forrester. In it, Forrester argues that the use of computerized system models to inform social policy is far superior to simple debate, both in generating insight into the root causes of problems and in understanding the likely effects of proposed solutions.

Description
Forrester characterizes normal debate and discussion as being dominated by inexact mental models:

The mental model is fuzzy. It is incomplete. It is imprecisely stated. Furthermore, within one individual, a mental model changes with time and even during the flow of a single conversation. The human mind  assembles a few relationships to fit the context of a discussion. As  the subject shifts so does the model. When only a single topic is being discussed, each participant in a conversation employs a different mental model to interpret the subject. Fundamental assumptions differ but are never brought into the open. Goals are different and are left unstated. It is little wonder that compromise takes so long. And it is not surprising that consensus leads to laws and programs that fail in their objectives or produce new difficulties greater than those that have been relieved.

The paper summarizes the results of a previous study on the system dynamics governing economic dynamics in urban centers, which showed "how industry, housing, and people interact with each other as a city grows and decays." The study's findings, presented more fully in Forrester's 1969 book Urban Dynamics, suggest that the root cause of depressed economic conditions is a significant shortage of job opportunities relative to the population level, and that the most popular solutions proposed at the time (e.g. an increase in the amount of low-income housing available, or a reduction in real estate taxes) counter-intuitively serve to make the situation worse by increasing the population but not the availability of jobs, so that the relative shortage increases. The paper further suggests that measures to reduce the shortage -- such as the conversion of land use from housing to industry, or an increase in real estate taxes to spur redevelopment of property -- would counter-intuitively create the result desired when enacting the failed policies.

The paper also gives an overview of Forrester's model of world dynamics that correlates population, food production, industrial development, pollution, availability of natural resources, and quality of life, as well as projections of those values into the future under various assumptions. This model is presented more fully in Forrester's 1971 World Dynamics, and is notable primarily because it served as the initial basis for the World3 model used by Donella and Dennis Meadows in their popular 1972 book The Limits to Growth.

See also 

DYNAMO (programming language)
Roger Sisson

References

External links

 Selected papers by Forrester.
 
 Biography of Jay W. Forrester from the Institute for Operations Research and the Management Sciences
 "The many careers of Jay Forrester," MIT Technology Review, June 23, 2015
Jay Wright Forrester Papers, MC 439, box X. Massachusetts Institute of Technology, Institute Archives and Special Collections, Cambridge, Massachusetts.

1918 births
2016 deaths
20th-century American inventors
American systems scientists
Computer engineers
American operations researchers
IEEE Medal of Honor recipients
Massachusetts Institute of Technology alumni
National Medal of Technology recipients
Members of the United States National Academy of Engineering
MIT Sloan School of Management faculty
University of Nebraska–Lincoln alumni
People from Custer County, Nebraska
Howard N. Potts Medal recipients
Valdemar Poulsen Gold Medal recipients